Euproctoides is a genus of moths in the subfamily Lymantriinae. The genus was erected by George Thomas Bethune-Baker in 1911.

Species
Euproctoides acrisia (Plötz, 1880) western Africa, Congo
Euproctoides ansorgei (Jordan, 1904) Angola
Euproctoides ertli (Wichgraf, 1922) Angola
Euproctoides miniata Bethune-Baker, 1911 Angola
Euproctoides pavonacea (Romieux, 1934) Congo

References

Lymantriinae
Moth genera
Taxa named by Jacob Hübner